Quantum metrology is the study of making high-resolution and highly sensitive measurements of physical parameters using quantum theory to describe the physical systems, particularly exploiting quantum entanglement and quantum squeezing. This field promises to develop measurement techniques that give better precision than the same measurement performed in a classical framework. Together with quantum hypothesis testing, it represents an important theoretical model at the basis of quantum sensing.

Mathematical foundations  

A basic task of quantum metrology is estimating the parameter  
of the unitary dynamics

Typically, the system is composed of many particles, and the Hamiltonian is a sum of single-particle terms

where  acts on the kth particle. In this case, there is no interaction between the particles, and we talk about linear interferometers.

The achievable precision is bounded from below by the quantum Cramér-Rao bound as

Examples 
One example of note is the use of the NOON state in a Mach–Zehnder interferometer to perform accurate phase measurements.  A similar effect can be produced using less exotic states such as squeezed states. In quantum illumination protocols, two-mode squeezed states are widely studied to overcome the limit of classcial states represented in coherent states. In atomic ensembles, spin squeezed states can be used for phase measurements.

Applications 

An important application of particular note is the detection of gravitational radiation in projects such as LIGO or the Virgo interferometer, where high-precision measurements must be made for the relative distance between two widely-separated masses. However, the measurements described by quantum metrology are currently not used in this setting, being difficult to implement. Furthermore, there are other sources of noise affecting the detection of gravitational waves which must be overcome first. Nevertheless, plans may call for the use of quantum metrology in LIGO.

Scaling and the effect of noise 
A central question of quantum metrology is how the precision, i.e., the variance of the parameter estimation, scales with the number of particles. Classical interferometers cannot overcome the shot-noise limit. This limit is also frequently called standard quantum limit (SQL)

where is  the number of particles. Shot-noise limit is known to be asymptotically achievable using coherent states and homodyne detection. 

Quantum metrology can reach the Heisenberg limit given by

However, if uncorrelated local noise is present, then for large particle numbers the scaling of the precision returns to shot-noise scaling

Relation to quantum information science 
There are strong links between quantum metrology and quantum information science. It has been shown that quantum entanglement is needed to outperform classical interferometry in magnetrometry with a fully polarized ensemble of spins. It has been proved that a similar relation is generally valid for any linear interferometer, independent of the details of the scheme. Moreover, higher and higher levels of multipartite entanglement is needed to achieve a better and better accuracy in parameter estimation. Additionally, entanglement in multiple degrees of freedom of quantum systems (known as "hyperentanglement"), can be used to enhance precision, with enhancement arising from entanglement in each degree of freedom.

References

Quantum information science
Quantum optics